Anthony Eaton is an Australian writer of fantasy and young adult fiction.

Biography
Eaton was born in Papua New Guinea in 1972 and moved to Perth, Western Australia during his childhood. After attending university he worked as a literature and drama teacher at Trinity College, Perth for eight years. He currently lives in Canberra and is a lecturer at the University of Canberra. In 2000 Eaton's first novel was released in Australia, entitled The Darkness. It won the 2001 Western Australian Premier's award for Young Adult Literature and was a short-list nominee for the 2000 Aurealis Award for best fantasy novel. He then released two more books in 2001 and in 2003. In 2004 Eaton released Fireshadow, which won the Western Australian Premier's award for Young Adult Literature and was named as an honour book in the CBCA Book of the Year Awards. In 2005 he started his Darklands Trilogy with the first book, Nightpeople, being a short-list nominee for the 2005 Aurealis Award for best fantasy novel and best young-adult novel. In 2007 the second book in the trilogy, Skyfall won the 2007 Aurealis Award for best young-adult novel and in 2008 Into White Silence was named an honour book in the 2009 CBCA Book of the Year awards and was a short-list nominee for the Queensland Premier's Literary Awards. Eaton is currently teaching Creative Writing at the University of Canberra whilst he works on his next set of novels.

Bibliography

Novels
The Darkness (2000)
A New Kind of Dreaming (2001)
Fireshadow (2004)
Into White Silence (2008)

The Darklands Trilogy
Nightpeople (2005)
Skyfall (2007)
Daywards (2010)

Children's fiction
Nathan Nuttboard Trilogy
Nathan Nuttboard Hits the Beach (2003)
Nathan Nuttboard Family Matters (2006)
Nathan Nuttboard Upstaged (2008)

Other children's fiction
The Girl In The Cave (2005)

References

External links
Official site

Living people
1972 births
20th-century Australian novelists
21st-century Australian novelists
Australian fantasy writers
Australian male novelists
20th-century Australian male writers
21st-century Australian male writers